400s may refer to:
 The period from 400 to 499, almost synonymous with the 5th century (401–500)
 The period from 400 to 409, known as the 400s decade, almost synonymous with the 41st decade (401-410)